Bede Durbidge (born 23 February 1983) is an Australian professional surfer competing on the World Surf League World Tour. Durbo, Bej and The White Fijian are his nicknames.

Life
Bede Durbidge was born in Brisbane, Queensland and grew up in Point Lookout, on North Stradbroke Island. He began in the Australasian Junior Series, and after four years in the World Qualifying Series joined the World Championship Tour in 2005.

As a professional, his strongest achievement is winning the Boost Mobile Pro in Trestles, San Clemente, California. Only five waves was enough for him to defeat the seven-time champion Kelly Slater. He later came in second in the Quiksilver Pro Gold Coast of 2007. His best season was 2008, where he finished the ASP world tour as the runner-up overall.

He retired from the World Surf League in 2017, after 13 seasons, including three career victories and three years where he was ranked in the Top 5 (2007-2009). He plans to be the lead coach for Australia's elite surf team program in preparation for the 2020 Summer Olympics in Tokyo, Japan.

Victories 

Outside of the ASP World Tour:
2007: Vans Triple Crown of Surfing
2004: , Lacanau  - France
2003: Rip Curl Newquay Board Masters, Newquay - England

World Championship Tour Rankings
 2005: 29th (3,612 points)
 2006: 15th (4,539 points)
 2007: 5th (5,774 points)
 2008: 2nd (6,780 points)
 2009: 3rd (6,468 points)
 2010: 6th (39,000 points)
 2011: 16th (26,000 points)
 2012: 20th (16,250 points)
 2013: 21st (16,200 points)
 2014: 16th (28,450 points)
 2015: 12th (31,700 points)
 2016: 38th (5,750 points)
 2017: 24th (20,200 points)

Personal life
His wife, Tarryn, became a social media sensation from the gourmet lunches she made for their daughter Willow.

Durbidge is co-owner of Balter Brewing Company with Joel Parkinson, Josh Kerr and Mick Fanning.

References

External links

Bede Durbidge on World Surf League
Official site of Bede Durbidge in Mt. Woodgee
Durbidge, Bede on the Encyclopedia of Surfing
Bede Durbidge on LesSports.info

Australian surfers
World Surf League surfers
1983 births
Living people
Sportsmen from Queensland
Sportspeople from Brisbane
People from Redland City